This page covers all relevant details regarding PFC Cherno More Varna for all official competitions inside the 2008-09 season. These are A PFG, Bulgarian Cup and UEFA Cup.

2008-09 Squad
As of 27 April 2009

|}

Squad changes

Summer'2008
In
  Georgi Iliev - Signed from CSKA Sofia
  Yordan Yurukov - Signed from CSKA Sofia
  Tanko Dyakov - Signed from Vihren
  Milen Petkov - Signed from Ilisiakos F.C.
  Evgheni Hmaruc - Signed from Persija Jakarta
  Adrián Fernández - Signed from FC St. Gallen

Out
  Aleksandar Tomash - Signed with FK Baku 
  Kiril Djorov - Signed with Vihren 
  Tigran Gharabaghtsyan - Signed with Pyunik Yerevan 
  Konstantin Mirchev - Signed with Omonia Aradippou 
  Masena Moke - Signed with Vihren

Winter'2009
In
  Mamoutou Coulibaly - Signed from FC Brussels
  Sebastián Flores - Signed from CD Cobenas
  Georgi Kakalov - Signed from Dinamo Minsk
  Atanas Bornosuzov - Signed from Al Salmiya
  Ilko Pirgov - Signed from CS Otopeni
  Stanislavs Pihockis - Signed from FK Riga

Out
  Evgheni Hmaruc
  Petar Kostadinov - Signed with Beroe 
  Vladimir Kostadinov - Loan to Chernomorets Balchik 
  Georgi Andonov - Loan to Botev Plovdiv 
  Adrián Fernández - Signed with Chernomorets Burgas 
  Peris - to Reserve squad 
  Ricardo André - to Reserve squad

Management
 Manager: Nikola Spasov
 Assistant Managers: Velizar Popov
 Goalkeeping Coach: Krasimir Kolev
 Fitness Coach: Veselin Markov
 Medic: Metin Mutlu

Administration
 President: Marin Mitev
 Vicepresident: Nikolay Nikolaev
 General Manager: Marin Marinov
 Marketing Director: Mihail Statev
 Press Officer: Krasimir Nikolov

Matches

A PFG
Kick-off listed in local time (EET)

League table

Results summary

League performance

Bulgarian Cup
Kick-off listed in local time (EET)

UEFA Cup
Kick-off listed in local time

Footnotes

See also
PFC Cherno More Varna 
2007–08 PFC Cherno More Varna season

PFC Cherno More Varna seasons
Cherno More Varna